Marcus is an unincorporated community in Carroll County, Illinois, United States. Marcus is located between Illinois Route 84 and the Mississippi River, north of Savanna.

References

Unincorporated communities in Carroll County, Illinois
Unincorporated communities in Illinois
Illinois populated places on the Mississippi River